Ophiclinus pectoralis, the whiteblotch snakeblenny, is a species of clinid found in reefs around western Australia preferring weedy and sandy areas at depths of about .  It can reach a maximum length of  TL.

References

pectoralis
Fish described in 1980
Taxa named by Victor G. Springer